Mundayki is a town and Union Council of Kasur District in the Punjab province of Pakistan. It is part of Chunian Tehsil and is located at 31°3'30N 73°51'20E with an altitude of 189 metres (623 feet).

References

Kasur District